Parapan may refer to:

 Parapan, a trade name for the drug Paracetamol
 Parapan American Games, a multi-sport event for athletes with physical disabilities held every four years after the Pan American Games